General elections were held in the Netherlands on 15 February 1967. The Catholic People's Party (KVP) remained the largest party, winning 42 of the 150 seats in the House of Representatives.

The elections led to a four-party coalition government being formed, consisting of the KVP, People's Party for Freedom and Democracy, Anti-Revolutionary Party and Christian Historical Union.

Results

References

General elections in the Netherlands
1967 elections in the Netherlands
Netherlands